Shakkanakku (Sumerian: , GIR.NITA or šagina, Shakkanakku), was an Akkadian language title designating a military governor. Mari was ruled by a dynasty of hereditary Shakkanakkus which was originally set by the Akkadian Empire and gained independence following Akkad's collapse. It is considered that the Shakkanakka gained some form of independence and came to be considered as "Kings" from the time of Apil-Kin. A critical analysis of the Shakkanakku List of Mari has been published. 

The title is also known around the same time in Elam, where several "Shakkanakku (Military Governor) of the country of Elam" with typically Akkadian names ruled for the Akkadian kings.

The title also existed in Qatna in the 14th century BC, and Dilmun under the Kassites.

Shakkanakkus under the Akkadians
Shakkanakkus, or Shagina  military governors are known from the time of the Akkadian Empire. For example, Shar-kali-sharri had a military governor in Nippur taking charge of the construction of the temple of Enlil. One of his year names reads: "Year in which Szarkaliszarri appointed Puzur-Esztar the shagina (general)" to build the temple of Enlil "Year Szarkaliszarri appointed Puzur-Eshtar, the shagina, to build the temple of Enlil".

Main Shakkanakkus of Mari
Several Shakkanakkus of Mari are known from archaeological artifacts:

List of Shakkanakku rulers of Mari

Main Shakkanakkus of Elam
The title is also known around the same time in Elam, as in the inscription of the "Table au Lion", Puzur-Inshushinak appears as "Puzur-Inshushin(ak) Ensi (Governor) of Susa, Shakkanakku (Military Governor) of the country of Elam" ( kutik-inshushinak ensi shushiki skakkanakku mati NIMki). A ruler with an Akkadian name, Ili-ishmani, at the time of Naram-Sin of Akkad or Shar-Kali-Sharri, also used the same title of "Skakkanakku of the country of Elam". This suggest that Ili-ishmani was a vassal of the Akkadian Empire.

List of the Shakkanakkus of Elam

References

Sources

Gubernatorial titles
Akkadian Empire